"Soul Singing" is a song by the American rock band The Black Crowes, released on July 23, 2001, as the second single from the group's sixth studio album Lions.

Writing and production

"Soul Singing" was co-written, like all original Black Crowes songs, by Chris and Rich Robinson.  The song began with a riff that Rich had written a "long time" before the recording of Lions.  Chris then added the vocal melodies and corresponding lyrics, which pertained to his then-wife, Kate Hudson.  While Chris believed this early form of "Soul Singing", with one instrumental section throughout, sufficed, Rich argued a second section was needed.  "So we talked about that one for a while", recalled Rich, who ultimately won the argument.

Rich recorded his guitar part with a James Trussart metal-bodied electric, which offered a resonator-like tone.  "I knew that guitar was the only one that could go from sounding acoustic in the verses to electric in the chorus in the way that I wanted", said Rich.

Track listing
All songs written by Rich & Chris Robinson.

UK CD1
 "Soul Singing" – 3:54
 "Love Is Now" – 4:23
 "Last Time Again" – 5:30

UK CD2
 "Soul Singing" – 3:54
 "Sleepyheads" – 4:15
 "Soul Singing" (Live) – 4:05

Charts

References

The Black Crowes songs
2001 singles
Song recordings produced by Don Was
2001 songs
Songs written by Chris Robinson (singer)
Songs written by Rich Robinson
Songs about music
Blues rock songs
Folk rock songs
Soul songs